Clayton M. Cunha Filho is a professor of Political Science at Universidade Federal do Ceará (UFC) in Fortaleza, Brazil.

References

Year of birth missing (living people)
Living people
Brazilian political scientists